Czerkasy may refer to:
Cherkasy, Ukraine – Czerkasy in Polish
Czerkasy, Lublin Voivodeship (east Poland)